Leon Liebgold (July 31, 1910, Kraków – September 3, 1993, New Hope, Pennsylvania) was an actor in the Yiddish theatre and in Yiddish language films, both in his native Poland and later in the United States, to which he emigrated. Liebgold is best known for his roles in The Dybbuk (1937), made in Poland, and Tevya (1939), a U.S. production. He was also featured in the highly successful 1936 film Yidl Mit'n Fidl with Molly Picon.

Liebman began his career as a vaudeville performer and actor on stages in Poland. He married his frequent co-star,  (1913-1989), also rendered in English as "Lily" or "Lilly," in 1935. After completing The Dybbuk, Liebgold and Liliana left Poland with their troupe, "Di Yidishe Bande," for a world tour, appearing in Lithuania, Latvia, Belgium, and France. In 1939, when World War II broke out, they were in the United States, thus fortuitously escaping the Holocaust.

Liebgold served in the United States Army as a sergeant during World War II, and then performed as a stage actor in Yiddish theaters in America for decades, including the Folksbiene Theater. He and Liliana also toured South America in the 1950s. In the late 1970s, he served as president of the Hebrew Actors' Union in Manhattan, New York.

Liebgold possessed both a resonant and fine melodic, cantorial-type voice which embellished both his speaking and singing on stage.

Liebgold died in 1993 at age 83. He and Liliana, married nearly 60 years until she predeceased him in 1989, are buried together at Mount Hebron Cemetery, in Queens, New York.

References

American male film actors
Yiddish theatre performers
American people of Polish-Jewish descent
Jewish American male actors
1910 births
1993 deaths
Yiddish film actors
20th-century American male actors
20th-century American Jews
Polish emigrants to the United States